XEX-FM is a radio station in Mexico City. Broadcasting on 101.7 MHz from atop the World Trade Center Mexico City, XEX-FM broadcasts the contemporary hit radio format taken from the Los 40 network. The vast majority of the songs played on-air are in English.

History
XEX-FM came to air on October 1, 1975, becoming the third FM station in the Radiópolis/Televisa Radio system. It began with a pop music format as "Stereo 102", but most of its history has been marked by constantly changing formats. In the early 1980s it was "Radio Romántica", then "Estelar FM" (both with romantic music), followed in 1988 by a return to pop music in English and Spanish as "Estéreo 102" and later "Yo 102"; this was when the station began to see ratings success.

In 1994, it experimented with the Kiss FM name, which failed to catch on. In 1996, after the brief return of Stereo 102, XEX became "Vox FM".

In 2002, Televisa Radio and Spain's PRISA began a partnership under which the Los 40 Principales brand, also present in Spain and other Latin American countries, came to Mexico for the first time. In turn, Televisa Radio and Grupo Radiorama signed an agreement, allowing the much larger Radiorama to syndicate the format to its stations for wider coverage across Mexico.

References

Radio stations established in 1975
Radio stations in Mexico City
1975 establishments in Mexico